Michael Murchison (born and raised in Sydney, Australia) is an Australian executive producer in the music industry. He has worked in the music and event industry around the world for the past 25 years.

Murchison's music touring credits include INXS, KISS, The Rolling Stones, Madonna, Guns N' Roses, The Sex Pistols, Tom Jones, Bob Dylan, The Bee Gees, Yothu Yindi, Reba McEntire, ZZ Top, Dame Shirley Bassey and John Fogerty.

His major event credits include the Harley-Davidson 100th Anniversary Open Road Tour, the 2002 World Cup Soccer Qualifier games, Manchester United exhibition games, Crowded House—Farewell to the World concert, Le Mans, Race of the Century, the Garma Festival, Noosa Film Festival and Rock the Millennium—Sydney New Year's Eve 1999.

He is one of the executive producers of Rock Star: INXS.

References 
 Biography

Australian music industry
Living people
People from Sydney
Year of birth missing (living people)